Akkum (also spelled Akoum, also known as Ayn al-Safa) is a village in central Syria, administratively part of the Homs Governorate, located southwest of Homs and immediately north and south of the border with Lebanon. Nearby localities include al-Hawik, Wadi Hanna, Baluzah and al-Aqrabiyah to the east. According to the Central Bureau of Statistics (CBS), Akkum had a population of 506 in the 2004 census. Its inhabitants are predominantly Shia Muslims.

References

Populated places in al-Qusayr District
Shia Muslim communities in Syria